Sonic Bloom or Sonicbloom may refer to:

 Tin Foil Phoenix, a band that released its first EP under the name Sonic Bloom
 "Sonic Bloom", a single by Tripping Daisy from their album Jesus Hits Like The Atom Bomb, later covered by The Polyphonic Spree on their Wait EP 
 Hiromi's Sonicbloom, group formed by jazz pianist Hiromi Uehara
Sonic Bloom (festival), an  electronic music festival
Sonic Bloom (sculpture), a solar-powered art installation created by Dan Corson in Seattle, Washington, U.S.
 Sonic Bloom (technology), sonication of plants to improve the absorption of foliar fertilizers at foliar feeding